Centruroides nigrimanus is a species of scorpion in the family Buthidae. This species is endemic of Mexico (type from Oaxaca). It occurs in the Mexican states of Chiapas, Oaxaca and Guerrero. [Pocock 1998 indicated a juvenile specimen from Honduras might be this species, but this has never been substantiated, and unlikely]

Original publication
 Pocock, 1898 : Descriptions of some new Scorpions from Central and South America. Annals and Magazine of Natural History, ser. 7,  (texte intégral).

References

 Référence Rolando Teruel & Victor Fet dans Joel Hallan

nigrimanus
Animals described in 1898
Endemic scorpions of Mexico